Our Saviour's Atonement Lutheran Church was a Lutheran church in Washington Heights, Manhattan, New York City at 578-580 West 187th Street. The church building built 1925 to 1926 at a cost of $30,000 to designs by an architect Stoyan N. Karastoyanoff of 220 Audubon Avenue. It was demolished and there is no longer a parish of St. Luke's in New York. Before the church was completed the original Lutheran Church of Our Saviour merged with The Evangelical Lutheran Church of the Atonement to become Our Saviour's Atonement Lutheran Church.The pastor at the time of construction was the Rev. Arthur E. Deitz. 

Both merged congregations had been founded as mission churches of St. John's Evangelical Lutheran Church. The former Atonement Lutheran's church (established in 1896) at 116 Edgecombe Avenue (built 1897 and now owned by Mount Calvary United Methodist Church. Our Saviour's Church (established 1898), was first located at 525 West 179th Street before moving to 580 West 187th Street as the merged congregation. The congregation moved into their parish house after the Great Depression and the church is now the home of Holy Cross Armenian Apostolic Church. 

The merged congregation continued to acquire property in Washington Heights speculating on the area's development with the extension of the New York City Subway's IRT Broadway–Seventh Avenue Line and IND Eighth Avenue Line. A hospital was planned but not begun. A parish house was started and completed in 1928 at a cost of $175,000 to designs by Mayers, Murray & Phillip of 2 West 47th Street. After the Stock Market Crash of 1929, plans for a new Gothic Revival church, designed by Mayers, Murray & Phillip, were scuttled. The congregation moved into the parish house, which was renamed the Cornerstone Center, "providing space for a video studio, dance and performance space, a kindergarten, a church for the deaf, and facilities of The Reform Jewish congregation Beth Am, "The People's Temple."

References 
Notes

Bibliography

External links

 Organ webpage

Lutheran churches in New York City
Washington Heights, Manhattan
Churches in Manhattan
Churches completed in 1926
19th-century Lutheran churches in the United States
Former Lutheran churches in the United States